Alfie Patrick Egan (born 3 September 1997) is an English footballer who plays as a midfielder for Dorking Wanderers.

Career
Egan began his career with AFC Wimbledon by making his first-team debut in the EFL Trophy win against Plymouth Argyle. A league debut for Egan came just five days later as a late substitute on 9 October 2016 in a 3–1 win against Oxford United. He scored his first goal for Wimbledon in an EFL Trophy tie against Stevenage on 6 November 2018. Egan played out on loan at Sutton United, East Thurrock United and Kingstonian. He was released by the Dons at the end of the 2018-19 season.

Egan signed for Ebbsfleet United in July 2019 after a successful trial. He signed a new deal at the end of the season and then another new contract in March 2021 to keep him at the club until the end of the 2021-22 season. After signing this contract, he joined Maidenhead United on loan until June 2021.

On 1 July 2022, Egan joined National League club Boreham Wood following his departure from Ebbsfleet United. Having failed to make an appearance for the club, Egan departed for Dorking Wanderers on 8 September 2022 in a search for more playing time.

Career statistics

References

External links

1997 births
Living people
Footballers from Lambeth
English footballers
AFC Wimbledon players
Sutton United F.C. players
East Thurrock United F.C. players
Kingstonian F.C. players
Ebbsfleet United F.C. players
Maidenhead United F.C. players
Boreham Wood F.C. players
Dorking Wanderers F.C. players
Place of birth missing (living people)
English Football League players
National League (English football) players
Isthmian League players
Association football midfielders